Colusa High School is a public high school located in Colusa, Colusa County, California, United States.

In August 2010, it was featured on the MTV series If You Really Knew Me.

Colusa Grammar School and Colusa High School and Grounds (the 1926 building, which served as a junior high school until 1976) are both listed on the National Register of Historic Places.

References

External links
 Official Colusa High School website

Public high schools in California
Colusa, California
Schools in Colusa County, California
1926 establishments in California